Leon Levițchi (27 August 1918 – 16 October 1991) was a Romanian philologist and translator who specialised in the study of the English language and literature.

Life
The son of Diomid Leu, a clergyman and teacher, and Zenovia Gârlea, a primary school teacher, he went to secondary school in Chernivtsi and Hotin, taking his baccalaureat exam in Chernivtsi in 1937. Due to his good results, he was rewarded with a journey to Norway.

From 1937 to 1941 he studied at the School of English Studies at of The Department of Letters and Philosophy, University of Bucharest. His major was English language and literature, while his minor was aesthetics and literary criticism.

During the Second World War, he was an interpreter and translator for the Romanian military.

After the war, he started teaching English, first at high school level, and then at the University of Bucharest, where he ultimately became a professor. He retired in 1980.

Alone, and with Dan Duṭescu, he translated Eminescu's poems into English.

Together with fellow researcher Andrei Bantaș, Levițchi edited in 1991 what is so far the most comprehensive English-Romanian dictionary on paper, with over 70,000 entries. The two had also previously published a bilingual Romanian-English edition of Mihai Eminescu's poems, translated into English by themselves.

He had two daughters.

Works (selection)
 Dicționar român-englez, București, Ed. Științifică, 1960, 1965, 1973 ("Romanian-English dictionary")
 Gramatica limbii engleze, București, Ed. Științifică, 1967 (with Ioan Preda) ("English grammar book")
  Îndrumar pentru traducătorii din limba engleză în limba română. București: Editura științifică și enciclopedică, 1975 ("A Guide for English to Romanian Translators")
 Studii shakespeariene. Cluj-Napoca: Dacia, 1976 ("Shakesperean Studies")
 Istoria literaturii engleze și americane, vol. I-II. Cluj-Napoca: Dacia, 1985-1994 ("A History of English and American Literature")
 Limba engleză fără profesor. București: Teora, 1997 ("Teach Yourself English")
 Manualul traducătorului de limba engleză. București: Teora, 1994 ("A Manual for English Translators")
 Dicționar englez-român (edited with Andrei Bantaș), 1991 ("English-Romanian Dictionary")
 A History of Romanian Literature, 1989 (translation of George Călinescu's Istoria literaturii române de la origini pînă în prezent, 1941; re-edited by Al. Piru, 1982
 William Shakespeare, Opere complete'', 9 volumes, co-author (with Virgiliu Stefănescu-Drăgănești), 1988-1995

Memberships
Romanian Writers' Union (since 1955)
International Association of University Professors of English

Awards
Romanian Academy Award
Romanian Writers' Union's Translation Award, 1972 and 1978

References

External links
Interview with one of his daughters 
Another interview with one of his daughters 
 Exhibition on the occasion of the 90th anniversary of his birth at the V.A. Urechia Library in Galati

Linguists from Romania
Romanian translators
English–Romanian translators
Translators of William Shakespeare
Academic staff of the University of Bucharest
1918 births
1991 deaths
20th-century translators
20th-century poets
20th-century linguists
Romanian military personnel of World War II